The UK Songwriting Festival is a six-day residential event, held at Bath Spa University every August. It was launched in 2004 as part of a National Teaching Fellowship project by Joe Bennett. It is supported with contributors from the British Academy of Composers and Songwriters.

External links
UK Songwriting Festival
Bath Spa University
British Academy of Composers and Songwriters

Music in Bath, Somerset
Music festivals in Somerset
Recurring events established in 2004
2004 establishments in the United Kingdom
Annual events in the United Kingdom
Festivals in Bath, Somerset